Shaheen Khan may refer to:

 Shaheen Khan (Indian actress), Indian actress
 Shaheen Khan (Pakistani actress) (born 1960), Pakistani actress
 Shaheen Khan (British actress) (born 1960), British actress
 Shaheen Khan (cricketer) (born 1987), South African cricketer